István Bajkai (born in Budapest, Hungary on 17 January 1964) is a Hungarian lawyer and politician. He is a member of National Assembly of Hungary (Országgyűlés). He is a founding member of Fidesz.

References

See also 

 List of members of the National Assembly of Hungary (2018–2022)

Living people
1964 births
Hungarian politicians
21st-century Hungarian politicians
Fidesz politicians
Members of the National Assembly of Hungary (2018–2022)
Members of the National Assembly of Hungary (2022–2026)